Ōnakatomi no Yorimoto ( c. 886–958, 大中臣 頼基) was a middle Heian period waka poet and Japanese nobleman. He is a designated member of the Thirty-six Poetry Immortals.

Ōnakatomi no Yorimoto's poems are included in several official poetry anthologies, including the Shūi Wakashū. A personal collection known as the Yorimoto-shū (頼基集) also remains.

External links 
E-text of his poems in Japanese

10th-century Japanese poets

880s births
958 deaths
Year of birth uncertain

Date of birth unknown
Place of birth unknown
Date of death unknown
Place of death unknown